College of Applied Science Kozhikode also known as IHRD Calicut or CAS Calicut, is a Degree awarding educational institution located in Kiliyanad near Nadakkavu in Kozhikode district of kerala The college was established in the year 1993 and providing various undergraduate and postgraduate Courses. The college is managed by  IHRD and is affiliated to the Calicut University and approved by AICTE.

History 
The College started with an intake of 24 students each in B.Sc Electronics and Computer Science which was later increased to 36 from the 9th batch onwards. Initially the college was functioning at the Government L.P.School building, Thiruthiyad, Calicut which was provided by the Govt. Later this was developed into a self sufficient full fledged college with all infrastructure facilities. The college has its own three storeyed building with total floor area of 4000 m2 (approximately) constructed at a cost of Rs.125 lakhs at Kiliyanad, the heart of Calicut City. The College started functioning in the new campus in March 1997.

The College facilitates regular Post Graduates(PG) courses viz, MCA (3 years), M.Sc. Electronics, M.Sc. Computer Science & M.Com (2 Years), and Under Graduate (UG) courses viz., B.Sc. Electronics, B.Sc. Computer Science, BCA, B.Com with Computer Application, BBA, Bsc Mathematics and BA English (3 years). All the UG and PG courses of this institution are affiliated to the University of Calicut, carried out in semester system. The UG programmes and MCA are of 6 semesters spread over a period of 3 years and the PG programmes, M.Sc Computer Science, M.Sc electronics and M.Com are of 4 semester spread over a period of 2 years Multifarious short term training programmes in the area of Electronics and Computer Science too are offered.

Courses

Facilities 
 Computer Lab
 Electronics Lab
 Library
 seminar Hall
AV Room
Auditorium
Canteen
Smart Classrooms
Industrial Collaboration

How to Reach 
College of Applied Science Calicut is located in Kiliyanad near Nadakkavu In Kozhikode district of kerala 

Nearest Railway Station : Kozhikode Railway Station

Nearest Bus Stand : Kozhikode New Bus stand

Nearest Airport : Calicut International Airport Karipur

Nearest Hospital : Rajendra Hospital, Fathima Hospital

Nearest College: Malabar Christian College, Holy Cross Institute of Management and Technology

See also

References

External links
University of Calicut
University Grants Commission
National Assessment and Accreditation Council
Kerala University
MG University
Kannur University
Cochin University of Science and Technology
Abdul kalam Technological University
AICTE

Universities and colleges in Kozhikode district
Colleges affiliated with the University of Calicut